Dominik Riečický (born 9 June 1992) is a Slovak ice hockey goaltender who currently plays with HC Košice of the Slovak Extraliga.

Career statistics

Regular season and playoffs

References

External links

1992 births
Living people
Sportspeople from Košice
HC Košice players
HC Prešov players
HK Spišská Nová Ves players
HC 07 Detva players
MHC Martin players
Slovak ice hockey goaltenders